Bolitophila cinerea  is a Palearctic (Ireland to South Siberian Mountains) species of  'fungus gnat' in the family Bolitophilidae.

The eucephalic larvae of Bolitophila are mycetophagous and live in decaying wood or other organic debris overgrown by fungal plant substrates. The pupa lacks a puparium.  Bolitophila cinerea feeds on a variety of Hypholoma and Pholiota species also on species of Agaricus, Amanita, Armillaria, Boletus, Collybia, Flammulina, Hebeloma, Lacrymaria and Marasmius.  Adults have been  obtained in emergence traps in a range of situations including rotting wood and soil litter.

References 

Bolitophilidae